No. 61 Squadron was a squadron of the Royal Air Force. It was first formed as a fighter squadron of the British Royal Flying Corps during the First World War. It was reformed in 1937 as a bomber squadron of the Royal Air Force and served in the Second World War and after, until disbanded in 1958.

History

First World War
No. 61 Squadron was formed at RAF Rochford, Essex, on 24 July 1917 or on 2 August of that year, as one of the first three single-seater fighter squadrons of the London Air Defence Area intended to counter the daylight air raids. It was equipped with the Sopwith Pup. The squadron first went into action on 12 August, when a formation of 10 Gotha bombers came in over the mouth of the Thames. Sixteen Pups of No. 61 Squadron took off to intercept them and succeeded in turning the enemy back, but not before two bombs had been dropped near No. 61's hangars on Rochford Aerodrome. In 1918 the squadron was re-equipped with SE5s, but before the Armistice was signed it began to change over to Sopwith Camels. The squadron used these and from January 1919 also some Sopwith Snipes until disbanded on 13 June 1919.

Second World War

No. 61 Squadron was re-formed on 8 March 1937 as a bomber squadron, and in World War II flew with No. 5 Group, RAF Bomber Command. The squadron's first operational mission was on 25 December 1939, comprising an armed reconnaissance over the North Sea by 11 Hampden bombers. This was followed on 7/8 March 1940 by the first bombing mission, when one Hampden, during a security patrol of Sylt-Borkum-Norderney, bombed an enemy destroyer which opened fire on it.

The unit took part in many notable operations including:
 the first bombing raid on a German land target (Hörnum, 19/20 March 1940);
 the first big bombing raid on the German mainland (Mönchengladbach, 11/12 May 1940): (RAF records record about half of the 36 'planes hit their targets, and four people killed on the ground; one of whom was a British woman living in Germany).
 the first bombing raid on Berlin (25/26 August 1940);
 the attacks on Le Creusot and Peenemünde (17 October 1942 and 17/18 August 1943, respectively);
 the successive drainings of the Dortmund-Ems and Mittelland Canals (late 1944);
 the attack on Wesel just before the crossing of the Rhine (23/24 March 1945).

Beginning operations with Hampdens, the squadron converted in July 1941 to the more modern Manchesters and later (spring 1942), Lancasters. Four of its Lancasters; ED860 "N-Nan", EE176, JB138, and LL483, each became veterans of more than 100 operational sorties. Records show that in the case of the first three aircraft, the long road to their centuries included participation in the raid on 3/4 November 1943, when Flight Lieutenant William Reid of No. 61 Squadron won the Victoria Cross.

In the summer of 1942 No. 61 was twice loaned to RAF Coastal Command for anti-submarine operations in the Bay of Biscay. It was detached from its base in Rutland to St Eval in Cornwall, and on the very first occasion that it operated from there, 17 July, a crew captained by Flight Lieutenant PR Casement (Lancaster I R5724) became the first Bomber Command crew to bring back irrefutable evidence that they had destroyed a U-boat at sea, in the form of a photograph showing the U-boat crew in the water swimming away from their sinking vessel.

The squadron's last operational mission in World War II was on 25/26 April 1945, when 10 Lancasters bombed an oil refinery and tankerage at Vallø (Tønsberg), and four other Lancasters aborted. The last mission before VE Day was on 6 May 1945, when the squadron's Lancasters ferried 336 ex-POWs home to the UK from Europe.

Post-war
No. 61 Squadron re-equipped with Avro Lincolns in May 1946. These saw action in Malaya as part of Operation Firedog and in Kenya during the Mau Mau Uprising. The squadron became an English Electric Canberra squadron at RAF Wittering in 1954. These took part in the Suez crisis of 1956. No. 61 disbanded on 31 March 1958.

Aircraft operated

Bases operated from

See also
 German submarine U-852

References

Notes

Bibliography

 Bowyer, Michael J.F. and John D.R. Rawlings. Squadron Codes, 1937-56. Cambridge, UK: Patrick Stephens Ltd., 1979. .
 Brammer, Derek A. Thundering Through the Clear Air:  No.61 (Lincoln Imp) Squadron at War. 1997. Republished 2005 by Tucann Design & Print, .
 Flintham, Vic and Andrew Thomas. Combat Codes: A full explanation and listing of British, Commonwealth and Allied air force unit codes since 1938. Shrewsbury, Shropshire, UK: Airlife Publishing Ltd., 2003. .
 Halley, James J. The Squadrons of the Royal Air Force & Commonwealth 1918-1988. Tonbridge, Kent, UK: Air Britain (Historians) Ltd., 1988. .
 Jefford, C.G. RAF Squadrons, a Comprehensive record of the Movement and Equipment of all RAF Squadrons and their Antecedents since 1912. Shrewsbury, Shropshire, UK: Airlife Publishing, 1988 (second edition 2001). .
 Moyes, Philip J.R. Bomber Squadrons of the RAF and their Aircraft. London: Macdonald and Jane's (Publishers) Ltd., 2nd edition 1976. .
 Rawlings, John D.R. Coastal, Support and Special Squadrons of the RAF and their Aircraft. London: Jane's Publishing Company Ltd., 1982. .
 Rawlings, John D.R. Fighter Squadrons of the RAF and their Aircraft. London: Macdonald & Jane's (Publishers) Ltd., 1969 (2nd edition 1976, reprinted 1978). .

External links

 No 61 - 65 Squadron Histories, Air of Authority
 Bomber Command page for No. 61 Squadron
 History page on RAF website

061
061
Military units and formations established in 1917
Bomber squadrons of the Royal Air Force in World War II
1917 establishments in the United Kingdom
Military units and formations disestablished in the 1950s